Pilgrim Song is a 2012 mumblecore drama film, directed by Martha Stephens, from a screenplay by Stephens, and Karrie Crouse. It stars Timothy Morton, Bryan Marshall, Karrie Crouse, Harrison Cole and Michael Abbott Jr.

The film had its world premiere at South by Southwest on March 10, 2012. It was released in a limited release on May 10, 2013, by Brink.

Plot
James, a music teacher, plans on hiking Kentucky's arduous Sheltowee Trace Trail, leaving his girlfriend Joan behind, he sets out on a two-month journey in hopes of discovering himself.

Cast
 Timothy Morton as James
 Bryan Marshall as Lyman
 Karrie Crouse as Joan
 Harrison Cole as Bo
 Michael Abbott Jr as Pharmer
 Kristin Slaysman as Rae

Release
The film had its world premiere at South by Southwest on March 10, 2012. Shortly after, Brink acquired distribution rights to the film. It was released in a limited release on May 10, 2013.

Critical reception
Pilgrim Song received negative  reviews from film critics. It holds a 20% approval rating on review aggregator website Rotten Tomatoes, based on 5 reviews, with a weighted average of 5.4/10. On Metacritic, the film holds a rating of 30 out of 100, based on 4 critics, indicating "generally unfavorable reviews".

References

External links

Official site

2012 films
2012 drama films
Films set in Kentucky
American independent films
Films directed by Martha Stephens
Films shot in Kentucky
2012 independent films
2010s English-language films
2010s American films